The  is a group of Japanese dialects in the Kansai region (Kinki region) of Japan. In Japanese,  is the common name and it is called  in technical terms. It is characterized as being both more melodic and harsher by speakers of the standard language.

Background 
Since Osaka is the largest city in the region and its speakers gained the most media exposure over the last century, non-Kansai-dialect speakers tend to associate the dialect of Osaka with the entire Kansai region. However, technically, Kansai dialect is not a single dialect but a group of related dialects in the region. Each major city and prefecture has a particular dialect, and residents take some pride in their particular dialectal variations.

The common Kansai dialect is spoken in Keihanshin (the metropolitan areas of the cities of Kyoto, Osaka and Kobe) and its surroundings, a radius of about  around the Osaka-Kyoto area (see regional differences). This article mainly discusses the Keihanshin version of the Kansai dialect in the Shōwa and Heisei periods.

Dialects of other areas have different features, some archaic, in common with the common Kansai dialect. Tajima and Tango (except Maizuru) dialects in northwest Kansai are too different to be regarded as Kansai dialects and are thus usually included in the Chūgoku dialect. Dialects spoken in Southeastern Kii Peninsula including Totsukawa and Owase are also far different from other Kansai dialects, and considered a language island. The Shikoku dialect and the Hokuriku dialect share many similarities with the Kansai dialects, but are classified separately.

History 
The Kansai dialect has over a thousand years of history. When Kinai cities such as Nara and Kyoto were Imperial capitals, the Kinai dialect, the ancestor of the Kansai dialect, was the de facto standard Japanese. It had an influence on all of the nation including the Edo dialect, the predecessor of modern Tokyo dialect. The literature style developed by the intelligentsia in Heian-kyō became the model of Classical Japanese language.

When the political and military center of Japan was moved to Edo under the Tokugawa Shogunate and the Kantō region grew in prominence, the Edo dialect took the place of the Kansai dialect. With the Meiji Restoration and the transfer of the imperial capital from Kyoto to Tokyo, the Kansai dialect became fixed in position as a provincial dialect. See also Early Modern Japanese.

As the Tokyo dialect was adopted with the advent of a national education/media standard in Japan, some features and intraregional differences of the Kansai dialect have diminished and changed. However, Kansai is the second most populated urban region in Japan after Kantō, with a population of about 20 million, so Kansai dialect is still the most widely spoken, known and influential non-standard Japanese dialect. The Kansai dialect's idioms are sometimes introduced into other dialects and even standard Japanese. Many Kansai people are attached to their own speech and have strong regional rivalry against Tokyo.

Since the Taishō period, the  form of Japanese comedy has been developed in Osaka, and a large number of Osaka-based comedians have appeared in Japanese media with Osaka dialect, such as Yoshimoto Kogyo. Because of such associations, Kansai speakers are often viewed as being more "funny" or "talkative" than typical speakers of other dialects. Tokyo people even occasionally imitate Kansai dialect to provoke laughter or inject humor.

Phonology 

In phonetic terms, Kansai dialect is characterized by strong vowels and contrasted with Tokyo dialect, characterized by its strong consonants, but the basis of the phonemes is similar. The specific phonetic differences between Kansai and Tokyo are as follows:

Vowels 

In Standard, vowel reduction frequently occurs, but it is rare in Kansai.
In Wakayama,   is also pronounced distinctly; it usually fuses into   in standard Japanese and almost all other dialects.
A recurring tendency to lengthen vowels at the end of monomoraic nouns.
Contrarily, long vowels in Standard inflections are sometimes shortened. This is particularly noticeable in the volitional conjugation of verbs. The common phrase of agreement,   meaning "that's it", is pronounced   or even   in Kansai.
For example,   "I love you" becomes  , 日曜日  "Sunday" becomes にっちょうび  and 賑やか  "lively, busy" becomes にんぎゃか .

Consonants 
In a provocative speech,  becomes  as well as Tokyo Shitamachi dialect.
This process has produced はん  for さん -san "Mr., Ms.", まへん  for ません  (formal negative form), and まひょ  for ましょう  (formal volitional form), ひちや  for 質屋  "pawnshop", among other examples.
Especially in the rural areas,  are sometimes confused. For example, でんでん  for 全然  "never, not at all", かだら  or からら  for 体  "body". There is a joke describing these confusions: 淀川の水飲んれ腹らら下りや  for 淀川の水飲んで腹だだ下りや  "I drank water of Yodo River and have the trots".
For example, 何してるねん？  "What are you doing?" often changes 何してんねん？  in fluent Kansai speech.

Pitch accent 

The pitch accent in Kansai dialect is very different from the standard Tokyo accent, so non-Kansai Japanese can recognize Kansai people easily from that alone. The Kansai pitch accent is called the Kyoto-Osaka type accent (京阪式アクセント, Keihan-shiki akusento) in technical terms. It is used in most of Kansai, Shikoku and parts of western Chūbu region. The Tokyo accent distinguishes words only by downstep, but the Kansai accent distinguishes words also by initial tones, so Kansai dialect has more pitch patterns than standard Japanese. In the Tokyo accent, the pitch between first and second morae usually change, but in the Kansai accent, it does not always.

Below is a list of simplified Kansai accent patterns. H represents a high pitch and L represents a low pitch.
  or 
 The high pitch appears on the first mora and the others are low: H-L, H-L-L, H-L-L-L, etc.
 The high pitch continues for the set mora and the rest are low: H-H-L, H-H-L-L, H-H-H-L, etc.
 The high pitch continues to the last: H-H, H-H-H, H-H-H-H, etc.
  or 
 The pitch rises drastically the middle set mora and falls again: L-H-L, L-H-L-L, L-L-H-L, etc.
 The pitch rises drastically the last mora: L-L-H, L-L-L-H, L-L-L-L-H, etc.
 If particles attach to the end of the word, all moras are low: L-L-L(-H), L-L-L-L(-H), L-L-L-L-L(-H)
 With two-mora words, there are two accent patterns. Both of these tend to be realized in recent years as L-H, L-H(-L).
 The second mora rises and falls quickly. If particles attach to the end of the word, the fall is sometimes not realized: L-HL, L-HL(-L) or L-H(-L)
 The second mora does not fall. If particles attach to the end of the word, both moras are low: L-H, L-L(-H)

The Kansai accent includes local variations. The traditional pre-modern Kansai accent is kept in Shikoku and parts of the Kii Peninsula such as Tanabe city. Even between Kyoto and Osaka, only 30 minutes by train, a few of the pitch accents change between words. For example, Tōkyō ikimashita ([I] went to Tokyo) is pronounced H-H-H-H H-H-H-L-L in Osaka, L-L-L-L H-H-L-L-L in Kyoto.

Grammar 

Many words and grammar structures in Kansai dialect are contractions of their classical Japanese equivalents (it is unusual to contract words in such a way in standard Japanese). For example, chigau (to be different or wrong) becomes chau, yoku (well) becomes yō, and omoshiroi (interesting or funny) becomes omoroi. These contractions follow similar inflection rules as their standard forms so chau is politely said chaimasu in the same way as chigau is inflected to chigaimasu.

Verbs 
Kansai dialect also has two types of regular verb, 五段 godan verbs (-u verbs) and 一段 ichidan verbs (-ru verbs), and two irregular verbs, 来る  ("to come") and する  ("to do"), but some conjugations are different from standard Japanese.

The geminated consonants found in godan verbs of standard Japanese verbal inflections are usually replaced with long vowels (often shortened in 3 morae verbs) in Kansai dialect (See also Onbin). This particular verb is a dead giveaway of a native Kansai speaker, as most will unconsciously say 言うて  instead of 言って  or  even if well-practiced at speaking in standard Japanese. Other examples of geminate replacement are 笑った  ("laughed") becoming 笑うた  or わろた  and 貰った  ("received") becoming 貰うた , もろた  or even もうた .

A compound verb てしまう  (to finish something or to do something in unintentional or unfortunate circumstances) is contracted to ちまう  or ちゃう  in colloquial Tokyo speech but to てまう  in Kansai speech. Thus, しちまう , or しちゃう , becomes してまう . Furthermore, as the verb しまう  is affected by the same sound changes as in other 五段 godan verbs, the past tense of this form is rendered as てもうた  or てもた  rather than ちまった  or ちゃった : 忘れちまった  or 忘れちゃった  ("I forgot [it]") in Tokyo is 忘れてもうた  or 忘れてもた  in Kansai.

The long vowel of the volitional form is often shortened; for example, 使おう  (the volitional form of tsukau) becomes 使お , 食べよう  (the volitional form of 食べる ) becomes 食べよ . The irregular verb する  has special volitional form しょ（う）  instead of しよう . The volitional form of another irregular verb 来る  is 来よう  as well as the standard Japanese, but when 来る  is used as a compound verb てくる , てこよう  is sometimes replaced with てこ（う）  in Kansai.

The potential verb endings  for 五段 godan and られる  for 一段 ichidan, recently often shortened れる , are common between the standard Japanese and Kansai dialect. For making their negative forms, it is only to replace ない  with ん  or へん  (See Negative). However, mainly in Osaka, potential negative form of 五段 godan verbs  is often replaced with  such as 行かれへん  instead of 行けない  and 行けへん  "can't go". This is because  overlaps with Osakan negative conjugation. In western Japanese including Kansai dialect, a combination of よう  and ん  negative form is used as a negative form of the personal impossibility such as よう言わん  "I can't say anything (in disgust or diffidence)".

Existence verbs 
In Standard Japanese, the verb iru is used for reference to the existence of an animate object, and iru is replaced with oru in humble language and some written language. In western Japanese, oru is used not only in humble language but also in all other situations instead of iru.

Kansai dialect belongs to western Japanese, but いる  and its variation, いてる  (mainly Osaka), are used in Osaka, Kyoto, Shiga and so on. People in these areas, especially Kyoto women, tend to consider おる  an outspoken or contempt word. They usually use it for mates, inferiors and animals; avoid using for elders (exception: respectful expression orareru and humble expression orimasu). In other areas such as Hyogo and Mie, いる  is hardly used and おる  does not have the negative usage. In parts of Wakayama, いる  is replaced with ある , which is used for inanimate objects in most other dialects.

The verb おる  is also used as an auxiliary verb and usually pronounced  in that case. In Osaka, Kyoto, Shiga, northern Nara and parts of Mie, mainly in masculine speech, よる  shows annoying or contempt feelings for a third party, usually milder than やがる . In Hyogo, southern Nara and parts of Wakayama, よる  is used for progressive aspect (See Aspect).

Negative 
The godan verbs conjugation before -hen has two varieties: the more common conjugation is  like 行かへん , but -ehen like 行けへん  is also used in Osaka. In traditional Kansai dialect, なんだ  and へなんだ  is used in the past negative form.

 五段 godan verbs: 使う  ("to use") becomes 使わん  and 使わへん , 使えへん 
 上一段 kami-ichidan verbs: 起きる  ("to wake up") becomes 起きん  and 起きやへん , 起きへん , 起きひん 
 one mora verbs: 見る  ("to see") becomes 見ん  and 見やへん , 見えへん , 見いひん 
 下一段 shimo-ichidan verbs: 食べる  ("to eat") becomes 食べん  and 食べやへん , 食べへん 
 one mora verbs: 寝る  ("to sleep") becomes 寝ん  and 寝やへん , 寝えへん 
 s-irregular verb: する  becomes せん  and しやへん , せえへん , しいひん 
 k-irregular verb: 来る  becomes 来ん  and きやへん , けえへん , きいひん 
 来おへん , a mixture けえへん  with standard 来ない , is also used lately by young people, especially in Kobe.

Generally speaking, へん  is used in almost negative sentences and ん  is used in strong negative sentences and idiomatic expressions. For example, んといて  or んとって  instead of standard ないで  means "please do not to do"; んでもええ  instead of standard なくてもいい  means "need not do";んと（あかん）  instead of standard なくちゃ（いけない）  or ねばならない  means "must do". The last expression can be replaced by な（あかん） or んならん .

Imperative 
Kansai dialect has two imperative forms. One is the normal imperative form, inherited from Late Middle Japanese. The normal imperative form is often followed by よ  or や . The end of the soft imperative form is often elongated and is generally followed by や  or な . In Kyoto, women often add よし  to the soft imperative form.

 godan verbs: 使う  becomes 使え  in the normal form, 使い（い）  in the soft one.
 上一段 kami-ichidan verbs: 起きる  becomes 起きい  (L-H-L) in the normal form, 起き（い）  (L-L-H) in the soft one.
 下一段 shimo-ichidan verbs: 食べる  becomes 食べえ  (L-H-L) in the normal form, 食べ（え）  (L-L-H) in the soft one.
 s-irregular verb: する  becomes せえ  in the normal form, し（い）  in the soft one.
 k-irregular verb: 来る  becomes こい  in the normal form, き（い）  in the soft one.

In the negative imperative mood, Kansai dialect also has the somewhat soft form which uses the ren'yōkei + な , an abbreviation of the ren'yōkei + なさるな . な  sometimes changes to なや  or ないな . This soft negative imperative form is the same as the soft imperative and な , Kansai speakers can recognize the difference by accent, but Tokyo speakers are sometimes confused by a command not to do something, which they interpret as an order to do it. Accent on the soft imperative form is flat, and the accent on the soft negative imperative form has a downstep before na.

 五段 godan verbs: 使う  becomes 使うな  in the normal form, 使いな  in the soft one.
 上一段 kami-ichidan verbs: 起きる  becomes 起きるな  in the normal form, 起きな  in the soft one.
 下一段 shimo-ichidan verbs: 食べる  becomes 食べるな  in the normal form, 食べな  in the soft one.
 s-irregular verb: する  becomes するな  or すな  in the normal form, しな  in the soft one.
 k-irregular verb: 来る  becomes 来るな  in the normal form, きな  in the soft one.

Adjectives 
The stem of adjective forms in Kansai dialect is generally the same as in standard Japanese, except for regional vocabulary differences.

The  ending can be dropped and the last vowel of the adjective's stem can be stretched out for a second mora, sometimes with a tonal change for emphasis. By this process, omoroi "interesting, funny" becomes omorō and atsui "hot" becomes atsū or attsū. This use of the adjective's stem, often as an exclamation, is seen in classical literature and many dialects of modern Japanese, but is more often used in modern Kansai dialect.

There is not a special conjugated form for presumptive of adjectives in Kansai dialect, it is just addition of やろ  to the plain form. For example, 安かろう  (the presumptive form of 安い  "cheap") is hardly used and is usually replaced with the plain form + やろ  likes 安いやろ . Polite suffixes です/だす/どす  and ます  are also added やろ  for presumptive form instead of でしょう  in standard Japanese. For example, 今日は晴れでしょう   ("It may be fine weather today") is replaced with 今日は晴れですやろ .

Copulae 

The standard Japanese copula da is replaced by the Kansai dialect copula ya. The inflected forms maintain this difference, resulting in yaro for darō (presumptive), yatta for datta (past); darō is often considered to be a masculine expression, but yaro is used by both men and women. The negative copula de wa nai or ja nai is replaced by ya nai or ya arahen/arehen in Kansai dialect. Ya originated from ja (a variation of dearu) in late Edo period and is still commonly used in other parts of western Japan like Hiroshima, and is also used stereotypically by old men in fiction.

Ya and ja are used only informally, analogically to the standard da, while the standard desu is by and large used for the polite (teineigo) copula. For polite speech, -masu, desu and gozaimasu are used in Kansai as well as in Tokyo, but traditional Kansai dialect has its own polite forms. Desu is replaced by dasu in Osaka and dosu in Kyoto. There is another unique polite form omasu and it is often replaced by osu in Kyoto. The usage of omasu/osu is same as gozaimasu, the polite form of the verb aru and also be used for polite form of adjectives, but it is more informal than gozaimasu. In Osaka, dasu and omasu are sometimes shortened to da and oma. Omasu and osu have their negative forms omahen and ohen.

When some sentence-final particles and a presumptive inflection yaro follow -su ending polite forms, su is often combined especially in Osaka. Today, this feature is usually considered to be dated or exaggerated Kansai dialect.
 -n'na (-su + na), emphasis. e.g. Bochi-bochi den'na. ("So-so, you know.")
 -n'nen (-su + nen), emphasis. e.g. Chaiman'nen. ("It is wrong")
 -ngana (-su + gana), emphasis. e.g. Yoroshū tanomimangana. ("Nice to meet you")
 -kka (-su + ka), question. e.g. Mōkarimakka? ("How's business?")
 -n'no (-su + no), question. e.g. Nani yūteman'no? ("What are you talking about?")
 -sse (-su + e, a variety of yo), explain, advise. e.g. Ee toko oshiemasse! ("I'll show you a nice place!")
 -ssharo (-su + yaro), surmise, make sure. e.g. Kyō wa hare dessharo. ("It may be fine weather today")

Aspect 
In common Kansai dialect, there are two forms for the continuous and progressive aspects -teru and -toru; the former is a shortened form of -te iru just as does standard Japanese, the latter is a shortened form of -te oru which is common to other western Japanese. The proper use between -teru and -toru is same as iru and oru.

In the expression to the condition of inanimate objects, -taru or -taaru form, a shortened form of -te aru. In standard Japanese, -te aru is only used with transitive verbs, but Kansai -taru or -taaru is also used with intransitive verbs. One should note that -te yaru, "to do for someone," is also contracted to -taru (-charu in Senshu and Wakayama), so as not to confuse the two.

Other Western Japanese as Chūgoku and Shikoku dialects has the discrimination of grammatical aspect, -yoru in progressive and -toru in perfect. In Kansai, some dialects of southern Hyogo and Kii Peninsula have these discrimination, too. In parts of Wakayama, -yoru and -toru are replaced with -yaru and -taaru/chaaru.

Politeness 

Historically, extensive use of keigo (honorific speech) was a feature of the Kansai dialect, especially in Kyōto, while the Kantō dialect, from which standard Japanese developed, formerly lacked it. Keigo in standard Japanese was originally borrowed from the medieval Kansai dialect. However, keigo is no longer considered a feature of the dialect since Standard Japanese now also has it. Even today, keigo is used more often in Kansai than in the other dialects except for the standard Japanese, to which people switch in formal situations.

In modern Kansai dialect, -haru (sometimes -yaharu except godan verbs, mainly Kyōto) is used for showing reasonable respect without formality especially in Kyōto. The conjugation before -haru has two varieties between Kyōto and Ōsaka (see the table below). In Southern Hyōgo, including Kōbe, -te ya is used instead of -haru. In formal speech, -naharu and -haru connect with -masu and -te ya changes -te desu.

-Haru was originally a shortened form of -naharu, a transformation of -nasaru. -Naharu has been dying out due to the spread of -haru but its imperative form -nahare (mainly Ōsaka) or -nahai (mainly Kyōto, also -nai) and negative imperative form -nasan'na or -nahan'na has comparatively survived because -haru lacks an imperative form. In more honorific speech, o- yasu, a transformation of o- asobasu, is used especially in Kyōto and its original form is same to its imperative form, showing polite invitation or order. Oide yasu and okoshi yasu (more respectful), meaning "welcome", are the common phrases of sightseeing areas in Kyōto. -Te okun nahare (also -tokun nahare, -toku nahare) and -te okure yasu (also -tokure yasu, -tokuryasu) are used instead of -te kudasai in standard Japanese.

Particles 

There is some difference in the particles between Kansai dialect and standard Japanese. In colloquial Kansai dialect,  are often left out especially the accusative case o and the quotation particles to and te (equivalent to tte in standard). The ellipsis of to and te happens only before two verbs: yū (to say) and omou (to think). For example, Tanaka-san to yū hito ("a man called Mr. Tanaka") can change to Tanaka-san yū hito. And to yū is sometimes contracted to chū or tchū instead of te, tsū or ttsū in Tokyo. For example, nanto yū koto da! or nante kotta! ("My goodness!") becomes nanchū kotcha! in Kansai.

The  na or naa is used very often in Kansai dialect instead of ne or nee in standard Japanese. In standard Japanese, naa is considered rough masculine style in some context, but in Kansai dialect naa is used by both men and women in many familiar situations. It is not only used as interjectory particle (as emphasis for the imperative form, expression an admiration, and address to listeners, for example), and the meaning varies depending on context and voice intonation, so much so that naa is called the world's third most difficult word to translate. Besides naa and nee, noo is also used in some areas, but noo is usually considered too harsh a masculine particle in modern Keihanshin.

Kara and node, the  meaning "because," are replaced by sakai or yotte; ni is sometimes added to the end of both, and sakai changes to sake in some areas. Sakai was so famous as the characteristic particle of Kansai dialect that a special saying was made out of it: ". However, in recent years, the standard kara and node have become dominant.

Kate or katte is also characteristic particle of Kansai dialect, transformation of ka tote. Kate has two usages. When kate is used with conjugative words, mainly in the past form and the negative form, it is the equivalent of the English "even if" or "even though", such as Kaze hiita kate, watashi wa ryokō e iku ("Even if [I] catch a cold, I will go on the trip"). When kate is used with nouns, it means something like "even", "too," or "either", such as Ore kate shiran ("I don't know, either"), and is similar to the particle mo and datte.

Sentence final particles 
The  used in Kansai differ widely from those used in Tokyo. The most prominent to Tokyo speakers is the heavy use of wa by men. In standard Japanese, it is used exclusively by women and so is said to sound softer. In western Japanese including Kansai dialect, however, it is used equally by both men and women in many different levels of conversation. It is noted that the feminine usage of wa in Tokyo is pronounced with a rising intonation and the Kansai usage of wa is pronounced with a falling intonation.

Another difference in sentence final particles that strikes the ear of the Tokyo speaker is the nen particle such as nande ya nen!, "you gotta be kidding!" or "why/what the hell?!", a stereotype tsukkomi phrase in the manzai. It comes from no ya (particle no + copula ya, also n ya) and much the same as the standard Japanese no da (also n da). Nen has some variation, such as neya (intermediate form between no ya and nen), ne (shortened form), and nya (softer form of neya). When a copula precedes these particles, da + no da changes to na no da (na n da) and ya + no ya changes to na no ya (na n ya), but ya + nen does not change to na nen. No da is never used with polite form, but no ya and nen can be used with formal form such as nande desu nen, a formal form of nande ya nen. In past tense, nen changes to -ten; for example, "I love you" would be suki ya nen or sukkya nen, and "I loved you" would be suki yatten.

In the interrogative sentence, the use of nen and no ya is restricted to emphatic questions and involves interrogative words. For simple questions, (no) ka is usually used and ka is often omitted as well as standard Japanese, but no is often changed n or non (somewhat feminine) in Kansai dialect. In standard Japanese, kai is generally used as a masculine variation of ka, but in Kansai dialect, kai is used as an emotional question and is mainly used for rhetorical question rather than simple question and is often used in the forms as kaina (softer) and kaiya (harsher). When kai follows the negative verb ending -n, it means strong imperative sentence. In some areas such as Kawachi and Banshu, ke is used instead of ka, but it is considered a harsh masculine particle in common Kansai dialect.

The emphatic particle ze, heard often from Tokyo men, is rarely heard in Kansai. Instead, the particle de is used, arising from the replacement of z with d in words. However, despite the similarity with ze, the Kansai de does not carry nearly as heavy or rude a connotation, as it is influenced by the lesser stress on formality and distance in Kansai. In Kyoto, especially feminine speech, de is sometimes replaced with e. The particle zo is also replaced to do by some Kansai speakers, but do carries a rude masculine impression unlike de.

The emphasis or tag question particle jan ka in the casual speech of Kanto changes to yan ka in Kansai. Yan ka has some variations, such as a masculine variation yan ke (in some areas, but yan ke is also used by women) and a shortened variation yan, just like jan in Kanto. Jan ka and jan are used only in informal speech, but yan ka and yan can be used with formal forms like sugoi desu yan! ("It is great!"). Youngsters often use yan naa, the combination of yan and naa for tag question.

Vocabulary 

In some cases, Kansai dialect uses entirely different words. The verb hokasu corresponds to standard Japanese suteru "to throw away", and metcha corresponds to the standard Japanese slang chō "very". Chō, in Kansai dialect, means "a little" and is a contracted form of chotto. Thus the phrase chō matte "wait a minute" by a Kansai person sounds strange to a Tokyo person.

Some Japanese words gain entirely different meanings or are used in different ways when used in Kansai dialect. One such usage is of the word naosu (usually used to mean "correct" or "repair" in the standard language) in the sense of "put away" or "put back." For example, kono jitensha naoshite means "please put back this bicycle" in Kansai, but many standard speakers are bewildered since in standard Japanese it would mean "please repair this bicycle".

Another widely recognized Kansai-specific usage is of aho. Basically equivalent to the standard baka "idiot, fool", aho is both a term of reproach and a term of endearment to the Kansai speaker, somewhat like English twit or silly. Baka, which is used as "idiot" in most regions, becomes "complete moron" and a stronger insult than aho. Where a Tokyo citizen would almost certainly object to being called baka, being called aho by a Kansai person is not necessarily much of an insult. Being called baka by a Kansai speaker is however a much more severe criticism than it would be by a Tokyo speaker. Most Kansai speakers cannot stand being called baka but don't mind being called aho.

Well-known words 
Here are some words and phrases famous as part of the Kansai dialect:

Pronouns and honorifics 

Standard first-person pronouns such as watashi, boku and ore are also generally used in Kansai, but there are some local pronoun words. Watashi has many variations: watai, wate (both gender), ate (somewhat feminine), and wai (masculine, casual). These variations are now archaic, but are still widely used in fictitious creations to represent stereotypical Kansai speakers especially wate and wai. Elderly Kansai men frequent use washi as well as other western Japan. Uchi is famous for the typical feminine first-person pronoun of Kansai dialect and it is still popular among Kansai girls.

In Kansai, omae and anta are often used for the informal second-person pronoun. Anata is hardly used. Traditional local second-person pronouns include omahan (omae + -han), anta-han and ansan (both are anta + -san, but anta-han is more polite). An archaic first-person pronoun, ware, is used as a hostile and impolite second-person pronoun in Kansai. Jibun is a Japanese word meaning "oneself" and sometimes "I," but it has an additional usage in Kansai as a casual second-person pronoun.

In traditional Kansai dialect, the honorific suffix -san is sometimes pronounced -han when -san follows a, e and o; for example, okaasan ("mother") becomes okaahan, and Satō-san ("Mr. Satō") becomes Satō-han. It is also the characteristic of Kansai usage of honorific suffixes that they can be used for some familiar inanimate objects as well, especially in Kyoto. In standard Japanese, the usage is usually considered childish, but in Kansai, o-imo-san, o-mame-san and ame-chan are often heard not only in children's speech but also in adults' speech. The suffix -san is also added to some familiar greeting phrases; for example, ohayō-san ("good morning") and omedetō-san ("congratulations").

Regional differences 
Since Kansai dialect is actually a group of related dialects, not all share the same vocabulary, pronunciation, or grammatical features. Each dialect has its own specific features discussed individually here.

Here is a division theory of Kansai dialects proposed by Mitsuo Okumura in 1968; ■ shows dialects influenced by Kyoto dialect and □ shows dialects influenced by Osaka dialect, proposed by Minoru Umegaki in 1962.
  Inner Kansai dialect
 ■Kyoto dialect (southern part of Kyoto Prefecture, especially the city of Kyoto)
 Gosho dialect (old court dialect of Kyoto Gosho)
 Machikata dialect (Kyoto citizens' dialect including several social dialects)
 Tanba dialect (southeastern part of former Tanba Province)
 Southern Yamashiro dialect (southern part of former Yamashiro Province)
 □Osaka dialect (Osaka Prefecture, especially the city of Osaka)
 Settsu dialect (Northern part of Osaka Prefecture, former Settsu Province)
 Senba dialect (old merchant dialect in the central area of the city of Osaka)
 Kawachi dialect (eastern part of Osaka Prefecture, former Kawachi Province)
 Senshū dialect (southwestern part of Osaka Prefecture, former Izumi Province)
 □Kobe dialect (the city of Kobe, Hyōgo Prefecture)
 □Northern Nara dialect (northern part of Nara Prefecture)
 ■Shiga dialect (main part of Shiga Prefecture)
 ■Iga dialect (northwestern part of Mie Prefecture, former Iga Province)
 Outer Kansai dialect
 Northern Kansai dialect
 ■Tanba dialect (northern part of former Tanba Province and Maizuru)
 ■Southern Fukui dialect (southern part of Fukui Prefecture, former Wakasa Province and Tsuruga)
 ■Kohoku dialect (northeastern part of Shiga Prefecture)
 Western Kansai dialect
 □Banshū dialect (southwestern part of Hyōgo Prefecture, former Harima Province)
 ■Tanba dialect (southwestern part of former Tanba Province)
 Eastern Kansai dialect
 ■Ise dialect (northern part of Mie Prefecture, former Ise Province)
 Southern Kansai dialect
 Kishū dialect (Wakayama Prefecture and southern part of Mie Prefecture, former Kii Province)
 Shima dialect (southeastern part of Mie Prefecture, former Shima Province)
 □Awaji dialect (Awaji Island in Hyōgo Prefecture)
 Totsukawa-Kumano dialect (southern part of Yoshino and Owase-Kumano area in southeastern Kii Peninsula)

Osaka 
Osaka-ben (大阪弁) is often identified with Kansai dialect by most Japanese, but some of the terms considered to be characteristic of Kansai dialect are actually restricted to Osaka and its environs. Perhaps the most famous is the term mōkarimakka?, roughly translated as "how is business?", and derived from the verb mōkaru (儲かる), "to be profitable, to yield a profit". This is supposedly said as a greeting from one Osakan to another, and the appropriate answer is another Osaka phrase, maa, bochi bochi denna "well, so-so, y'know".

The idea behind mōkarimakka is that Osaka was historically the center of the merchant culture. The phrase developed among low-class shopkeepers and can be used today to greet a business proprietor in a friendly and familiar way but is not a universal greeting. The latter phrase is also specific to Osaka, in particular the term bochi bochi (L-L-H-L). This means essentially "so-so": getting better little by little or not getting any worse. Unlike mōkarimakka, bochi bochi is used in many situations to indicate gradual improvement or lack of negative change. Also, bochi bochi (H-L-L-L) can be used in place of the standard Japanese soro soro, for instance bochi bochi iko ka "it is about time to be going".

In the Edo period, Senba-kotoba (船場言葉), a social dialect of the wealthy merchants in the central business district of Osaka, was considered the standard Osaka-ben. It was characterized by the polite speech based on Kyoto-ben and the subtle differences depending on the business type, class, post etc. It was handed down in Meiji, Taishō and Shōwa periods with some changes, but after the Pacific War, Senba-kotoba became nearly an obsolete dialect due to the modernization of business practices. Senba-kotoba was famous for a polite copula gowasu or goasu instead of common Osakan copula omasu　and characteristic forms for shopkeeper family mentioned below.

Southern branches of Osaka-ben, such as Senshū-ben (泉州弁) and Kawachi-ben (河内弁), are famous for their harsh locution, characterized by trilled "r", the question particle ke, and the second person ware. The farther south in Osaka one goes, the cruder the language is considered to be, with the local Senshū-ben of Kishiwada said to represent the peak of harshness.

Kyoto 

Kyōto-ben (京都弁) or Kyō-kotoba (京言葉) is characterized by development of politeness and indirectness expressions. Kyoto-ben is often regarded as elegant and feminine dialect because of its characters and the image of Gion's geisha (geiko-han and maiko-han in Kyoto-ben), the most conspicuous speakers of traditional Kyoto-ben. Kyoto-ben is divided into the court dialect called Gosho kotoba (御所言葉) and the citizens dialect called Machikata kotoba (町方言葉). The former was spoken by court noble before moving the Emperor to Tokyo, and some phrases inherit at a few monzeki. The latter has subtle difference at each social class such as old merchant families at Nakagyo, craftsmen at Nishijin and geiko at Hanamachi (Gion, Miyagawa-chō etc.)

Kyoto-ben was the de facto standard Japanese from 794 until the 18th century and some Kyoto people are still proud of their accent; they get angry when Tokyo people treat Kyoto-ben as a provincial accent. However, traditional Kyoto-ben is gradually declining except in the world of geisha, which prizes the inheritance of traditional Kyoto customs. For example, a famous Kyoto copula dosu, instead of standard desu, is used by a few elders and geisha now.

The verb inflection -haru is an essential part of casual speech in modern Kyoto. In Osaka and its environs, -haru has a certain level of politeness above the base (informal) form of the verb, putting it somewhere between the informal and the more polite -masu conjugations. However, in Kyoto, its position is much closer to the informal than it is to the polite mood, owing to its widespread use. Kyoto people, especially elderly women, often use -haru for their family and even for animals and weather.

Tango-ben (丹後弁) spoken in northernmost Kyoto Prefecture, is too different to be regarded as Kansai dialect and usually included in Chūgoku dialect.

Hyogo 

Hyōgo Prefecture is the largest prefecture in Kansai, and there are some different dialects in the prefecture. As mentioned above, Tajima-ben (但馬弁) spoken in northern Hyōgo, former Tajima Province, is included in Chūgoku dialect as well as Tango-ben. Ancient vowel sequence /au/ changed  in many Japanese dialects, but in Tajima, Tottori and Izumo dialects, /au/ changed . Accordingly, Kansai word ahō "idiot" is pronounced ahaa in Tajima-ben.

The dialect spoken in southwestern Hyōgo, former Harima Province alias Banshū, is called Banshū-ben. As well as Chūgoku dialect, it has the discrimination of aspect, -yoru in progressive and -toru in perfect. Banshū-ben is notable for transformation of -yoru and -toru into -yō and -tō, sometimes -yon and -ton. Another feature is the honorific copula -te ya, common in Tanba, Maizuru and San'yō dialects. In addition, Banshū-ben is famous for an emphatic final particle doi or doiya and a question particle ke or ko, but they often sound violent to other Kansai speakers, as well as Kawachi-ben. Kōbe-ben (神戸弁) spoken in Kobe, the largest city of Hyogo, is the intermediate dialect between Banshū-ben and Osaka-ben and is well known for conjugating -yō and -tō as well as Banshū-ben.

Awaji-ben (淡路弁) spoken in Awaji Island, is different from Banshū/Kōbe-ben and mixed with dialects of Osaka, Wakayama and Tokushima Prefectures due to the intersecting location of sea routes in the Seto Inland Sea and the Tokushima Domain rule in Edo period.

Mie 
The dialect in Mie Prefecture, sometimes called Mie-ben (三重弁), is made up of Ise-ben (伊勢弁) spoken in mid-northern Mie, Shima-ben (志摩弁) spoken in southeastern Mie and Iga-ben (伊賀弁) spoken in western Mie. Ise-ben is famous for a sentence final particle ni as well as de. Shima-ben is close to Ise-ben, but its vocabulary includes many archaic words. Iga-ben has a unique request expression -te daako instead of standard -te kudasai.

They use the normal Kansai accent and basic grammar, but some of the vocabulary is common to the Nagoya dialect. For example, instead of -te haru (respectful suffix), they have the Nagoya-style -te mieru. Conjunctive particles de and monde "because" is widely used instead of sakai and yotte. The similarity to Nagoya-ben becomes more pronounced in the northernmost parts of the prefecture; the dialect of Nagashima and Kisosaki, for instance, could be considered far closer to Nagoya-ben than to Ise-ben.

In and around Ise city, some variations on typical Kansai vocabulary can be found, mostly used by older residents. For instance, the typical expression ōkini is sometimes pronounced ōkina in Ise. Near the Isuzu River and Naikū shrine, some old men use the first-person pronoun otai.

Wakayama 
Kishū-ben (紀州弁) or Wakayama-ben (和歌山弁), the dialect in old province Kii Province, present-day Wakayama Prefecture and southern parts of Mie Prefecture, is fairly different from common Kansai dialect and comprises many regional variants. It is famous for heavy confusion of z and d, especially on the southern coast. The ichidan verb negative form -n often changes -ran in Wakayama such as taberan instead of taben ("not eat"); -hen also changes -yan in Wakayama, Mie and Nara such as tabeyan instead of tabehen. Wakayama-ben has specific perticles. Yō is often used as sentence final particle. Ra follows the volitional conjugation of verbs as iko ra yō! ("Let's go!"). Noshi is used as soft sentence final particle. Yashite is used as tag question. Local words are akana instead of akan, omoshai instead of omoroi, aga "oneself", teki "you", tsuremote "together" and so on. Wakayama people hardly ever use keigo, which is rather unusual for dialects in Kansai.

Shiga 
Shiga Prefecture is the eastern neighbor of Kyoto, so its dialect, sometimes called Shiga-ben (滋賀弁) or Ōmi-ben (近江弁) or Gōshū-ben (江州弁), is similar in many ways to Kyoto-ben. For example, Shiga people also frequently use -haru, though some people tend to pronounce -aru and -te yaaru instead of -haru and -te yaharu. Some elderly Shiga people also use -raru as a casual honorific form. The demonstrative pronoun so- often changes to ho-; for example, so ya becomes ho ya and sore (that) becomes hore. In Nagahama, people use the friendly-sounding auxiliary verb -ansu and -te yansu. Nagahama and Hikone dialects has a unique final particle hon as well as de.

Nara 
The dialect in Nara Prefecture is divided into northern including Nara city and southern including Totsukawa. The northern dialect, sometimes called Nara-ben (奈良弁) or Yamato-ben (大和弁), has a few particularities such as an interjectory particle mii as well as naa, but the similarity with Osaka-ben increases year by year because of the economic dependency to Osaka. On the other hand, southern Nara prefecture is a language island because of its geographic isolation with mountains. The southern dialect uses Tokyo type accent, has the discrimination of grammatical aspect, and does not show a tendency to lengthen vowels at the end of monomoraic nouns.

Example 
An example of Kyoto women's conversation recorded in 1964:

See also

Kansai dialect in Japanese culture 

 Bunraku - a traditional puppet theatre played in the early modern Osaka dialect
 Kabuki - Kamigata style kabuki is played in Kansai dialect
 Rakugo - Kamigata style rakugo is played in Kansai dialect
 Mizuna - mizuna is originally a Kansai word for Kanto word kyōna
 Shichimi - shichimi is originally a Kansai word for Kanto word nanairo
 Tenkasu - tenkasu is originally a Kansai word for Kanto word agedama
 Hamachi - hamachi is originally a Kansai word for Kanto word inada

Related dialects 
 Hokuriku dialect
 Shikoku dialect
 Mino dialect

References

Notes

Bibliography 
For non-Japanese speakers, learning environment of Kansai dialect is richer than other dialects.
 Palter, DC and Slotsve, Kaoru Horiuchi (1995). Colloquial Kansai Japanese: The Dialects and Culture of the Kansai Region. Boston: Charles E. Tuttle Publishing. .
 
 
 Tse, Peter (1993). Kansai Japanese: The language of Osaka, Kyoto, and western Japan. Boston: Charles E. Tuttle Publishing. .
 
 Takahashi, Hiroshi and Kyoko (1995). How to speak Osaka Dialect. Kobe: Taiseido Shobo Co. Ltd. 
 Minoru Umegaki (Ed.) (1962). . Tokyo: Sanseido.
 Isamu Maeda (1965). . Tokyo: Tokyodo Publishing.
 Kiichi Iitoyo, Sukezumi Hino, Ryōichi Satō (Ed.) (1982). . Tokyo: Kokushokankōkai
 Shinji Sanada, Makiko Okamoto, Yoko Ujihara (2006). . Tokyo: Hituzi Syobo Publishing. .

External links 

 Kansai Dialect Self-study Site for Japanese Language Learner
 The Corpus of Kansai Vernacular Japanese
 The Kansai and Osaka dialects - nihongoresources.com
 Kansai Ben - TheJapanesePage.com
 Kansai Japanese Guide - Kansai-ben texts and videos made by Ritsumeikan University students
 Osaka-ben Study Website, Kyoto-ben Study Website - U-biq
 A Course in Osaka-ben - Osaka city

Japanese dialects
Kansai region